The Dictionary of Greek and Roman Biography and Mythology (1849, originally published 1844 under a slightly different title) is an encyclopedia/biographical dictionary. Edited by William Smith, the dictionary spans three volumes and 3,700 pages. It is a classic work of 19th-century lexicography. The work is a companion to Smith's Dictionary of Greek and Roman Antiquities and Dictionary of Greek and Roman Geography.

Authors and scope

The work lists thirty-five authors in addition to the editor, who was also the author of the unsigned articles. The other authors were classical scholars, primarily from Oxford, Cambridge, Rugby School, and the University of Bonn, but some were from other institutions. Many of the mythological entries were the work of the German expatriate Leonhard Schmitz, who helped to popularise German classical scholarship in Britain. 

With respect to biographies, Smith intended to be comprehensive. In the preface, he writes:

Much of the value of the Dictionary consists not only in the depth and detail of the individual articles, but in the copious and specific citations to individual Greek and Roman writers, as well as modern scholarship from the Renaissance to the mid-nineteenth century.  The articles frequently note variant traditions, disagreements among the authorities, and the interpretations of modern scholars.  However, due to the variable numbering systems used in different editions of classical works, and the difficulty of recognizing typographical errors in citations, the original sources should still be checked.  Many of the Dictionary's articles have been referred to in more recent works; Robert Graves has been accused of cribbing his impressive-looking source references from it when writing The Greek Myths.

Samuel Sharpe thought Edward Bunbury had plagiarised his work, as he wrote of in his diary entry on 3 September 1850: 

I certainly felt mortified on reading the articles on the Ptolemies in Dr. Smith's "Dictionary of Classical Biography." They were all written by E. H. Bunbury with the help of my "History of Egypt," and with-out any acknowledgment, though he even borrowed the volume from my brother Dan for the purpose.

Notable authors

 John Ernest Bode, Anglican hymnist.
 Christian August Brandis, German philologist.
 Albany James Christie, ecclesiastical historian.
 Arthur Hugh Clough, poet and assistant to Florence Nightingale
 George Cotton, educationalist and Bishop of Calcutta
 Samuel Davidson, biblical scholar
 William Fishburn Donkin, Savilian Professor of Astronomy at the University of Oxford.
 William Bodham Donne, theatrical censor and Examiner of Plays, the UK's chief theatrical censor.
 Thomas Henry Dyer, historian.
 Edward Elder, headmaster of Charterhouse and Durham School.
 John T. Graves, Irish mathematician who wrote the Dictionarys biographies of the jurists Cato, Crassus, Drusus, Gaius, as well as an article on the legislation of Justinian.
 William Alexander Greenhill, physician and medical writer.
 Wilhelm Ihne, German historian.
 Benjamin Jowett, Classicist, theologian and later master of Balliol College, Oxford.
 Henry Liddell, headmaster of Westminster School and co-author of A Greek–English Lexicon.
 George Long, classicist.
 Henry Hart Milman, Anglican priest, Dean of St Paul's Cathedral and Professor of Poetry in the University of Oxford.
 Augustus De Morgan, mathematician and logician.
 William Ramsay, classical scholar and Professor of Humanity in the University of Glasgow.
 Leonhard Schmitz, expatriate Prussian classicist and rector of the Royal High School, Edinburgh.
 Arthur Penrhyn Stanley, theologian and later Dean of Westminster.
 Adolf Stahr, German writer and literary historian.
 Ludwig von Urlichs, German philologist and archaeologist.

Use and availability today
The work is now in the public domain, and is available in several places on the Internet. A 2013 review of the fourth edition of the Oxford Classical Dictionary – itself hailed in its first edition in 1949 as "the new Smith" – called it:

Smith's dictionary, however, does have substantial flaws. Troy and Knossos, for example, "the editors still regarded... as minstrels' fantasies". Much is missing, especially more recent discoveries (such as Aristotle's Constitution of the Athenians or the decipherment of Linear B) and epigraphic material. More seriously, the context in which ancient evidence is viewed, analysed, reconciled, and understood has changed considerably in the intervening centuries. Modern theories and reconstructions of events are also not present, if only because they were published decades and centuries after Smith's Dictionary.

 See also 
 Dictionary of Greek and Roman Antiquities
 Dictionary of Greek and Roman Geography

ReferencesCitationsSources'

 .

External links

Online version at the Perseus Digital Library
Dictionary of Greek and Roman Biography and Mythology. Vol. I: Abaeus–Dysponteus online at University of Michigan Library.
Dictionary of Greek and Roman Biography and Mythology. Vol. II: Earinus–Nyx online at University of Michigan Library.
Dictionary of Greek and Roman Biography and Mythology. Vol. III: Oarses–Zygia online at University of Michigan Library.

Also the Internet Archive has a derivative work:
 
 

1849 books
Greek and Roman Biography and Mythology
Reference works in the public domain
References on Greek mythology